Pinni was a term for coarse cotton fabric, naturally reddish or reddish-yellow in colour, made locally in Myanmar.

Nationalism 
Pinni was a handwoven Burmese cloth. Inspired by the Indian Swadeshi movement's boycott of English products, pinni became a nationalist symbol in the early 20th century, often being used to cover traditional peindan sandals.

References 

Cotton
Woven fabrics
Burmese clothing